Henry Powell is the name of:

People
Henry Powell (governor) (c. 1600–1658), governor of Barbados
Henry Watson Powell (1733–1814), British officer
Henry Powell (Wisconsin politician) (1828–1902), American politician
E. Henry Powell (1839–1911), politician in Vermont
Henry Absalom Powell (1855–1930), Canadian lawyer and politician
Henry Powell (footballer) (1907–1992), Australian rules footballer for Fitzroy
Henry Powell (Louisiana politician) (born 1945), American politician, member of the Louisiana House of Representatives from 1996 to 2008

Fictional characters
Henry Powell (24), a character in the TV series 24

See also
Harry Powell (disambiguation)